Lenwade is a village in the civil parish of Great Witchingham, Norfolk, situated in the Wensum Valley adjacent to the A1067 road  south-east of Fakenham and some  north-west of Norwich. The River Ainse (or Eyn) joins the Wensum at Lenwade. In 2001 it had a population of 464.

Etymology

The name may mean 'ford of the slowly moving river'. The first element possibly means lane in the Scottish dialect sense of 'scarcely moving river'. The second element of the name is the Old English gewæd (ford).

Industry and the local economy 

Much of the surrounding land is given over to agriculture. However, due to its geographical location Lenwade became the centre of the sand and gravel extraction and the manufacturing of concrete products in the Wensum valley during the middle to late 20th century. The legacy of this activity can be seen in the many flooded gravel pits in the area. Today, these now mature lakes are popular with anglers, naturalists and bird watchers.

Industry today is concentrated to the southeast of Lenwade between the A1067 road and the former railway line. Concrete products, metal recycling, joinery and double glazing items are produced in the area.

Local tourist attractions include Roarr! Dinosaur Adventure theme park and the Lenwade country house hotel features in its grounds the only licensed zoological garden in the UK.

The Church of St Faith 
Located on the busy A1067 Fakenham Road, the building started life as a Victorian mission church originally dedicated to All Saints. Despite its central location the church was little used and became redundant. Today, the church is fenced off and planned to become a residential development (July 2008).

Amenities 

Amenities in the village include a village hall, primary school, doctor's surgery, general stores, garage, tea-rooms, butchers, bakers and a fish and chip shop.

Located close to A1067 and the River Wensum is the late 18th century Bridge Inn public house. The pub garden adjoins The Bridge Lakes (former gravel pits) and a section of the river where angling is possible. Matthew Brettingham's c.1741 triple arched brick bridge is depicted on the pub's sign. The bridge was demolished in 1993 and replaced by today's steel bridge.

Lenwade mill 

There has been a watermill on the river at Lenwade for many centuries. The present building, dating from the late 19th century, has been converted to homes

Railway history 

Lenwade railway station was built in 1882 with direct trains to Norwich and King's Lynn.  Passenger traffic ceased in 1959, but due to Lenwade's important Anglian cement and concrete works the freight line was kept open to 1985.  The former station today is a private residence and the track bed forms part of the Marriott's Way long-distance footpath.

Public transport 
Bus

Services are provided by FirstGroup and connect to Norwich and Fakenham.
X29

References

External links 
 Norfolk pubs-Lenwade
 Great Witchingham & Lenwade Village Hall

Villages in Norfolk
Great Witchingham